Wilpattu National Park (Willu-pattu, "Land of Lakes") is a national park in Sri Lanka. The unique feature of this park is the existence of "Willus" (natural lakes) – natural, sand-rimmed water basins or depressions that fill with rainwater. Nearly one hundred and six lakes (Willu) and tanks are found spread throughout Wilpattu. Wilpattu is the largest and one of the oldest national parks in Sri Lanka. Wilpattu is world-renowned for its leopard (Panthera pardus kotiya) population. A remote camera survey conducted in Wilpattu from July to October 2015 by the Wilderness and Wildlife Conservation Trust captured photographs of forty-nine individual leopards in the surveyed area, the core area density of which was between that of Yala National Park's Block I and Horton Plains National Park.

From December 1988 to 16 March 2003, the park was closed due to security concerns surrounding the Sri Lankan Civil War, before being reopened to visitors sixteen years later. Visitor access is currently limited to approximately 25% of the park, the remainder of which is dense forest or scrub. Popular visiting periods span between the months of February and October, although there are a number of private ecotourism groups that conduct safaris year-round.

History 
The Mahavansa records that in 543 BC Prince Vijaya landed at Tambapanni now known as Kudrimalai Point (Horse Point), established the Sinhalese kingdom in Tambapanni and founded the Sinhala nation. In 1905 the area was designated a sanctuary and in 1938 it was upgraded to the National Park status.'

Kudrimalai, or Horse Point, was visited by a subject of Emperor Claudius in 47 AD, who was blown off course by the monsoon. The local king later sent his own envoys to Rome during the time of Pliny.

Climate 

Inter-monsoonal rains in March and the northeast monsoon (December – February) are the main sources of rainfall.

Flora and fauna 
There are many types of vegetation to be found in Wilpattu, including littoral vegetation, such as salt grass and low scrub monsoon forest with tall emergents, such as palu (Manilkara hexandra), and satin (Chloroxylon swietenia), milla (Vitex altissima), weera (Drypetes sepiaria), ebony (Diospyros ebenum) and wewarna (Alseodaphne semecapriflolia).

31 species of mammals have been identified within Wilpattu national park. Mammals that are identified as threatened species living within the Wilpattu National Park are the elephant (Elephas maximus maximus), sloth bear (Melursus ursinus inornatus), leopard (Panthera pardus kotiya) and water buffalo (Bubalus bubalis). sambhur (Rusa unicolor unicolor), spotted deer (Axis axis ceylonensis), mongoose, mouse and shrew are more of Wilpattu's residents.

Birds 
The painted stork, the open bill, little cormorant, Sri Lankan junglefowl (Gallus lafayetii) along with many species of owls, terns, gulls, eagles, kites buzzards are to be found at Wilpattu National Park. Wetland bird species that can be seen in Wilpattu are the garganey (Anas querquedula), pintail (Anas acuta), whistling teal (Dendrocygna javanica), spoonbill (Platalea leucorodia), black-headed ibis (Threskiornis malanocephalus), large white egret (Egretta alba modesta), cattle egret (Bubulcus ibis) and purple heron (Ardea purpurea).

Reptiles 
The most common reptiles found in the park are the monitor lizard (Varanus bengalensis), mugger crocodile (Crocodylus palustris), common cobra (Naja naja), rat snake (Ptyas mucosus), Indian python (Python molurus), pond turtle (Melanonchelys trijuga) and the soft shelled turtle (Lissemys punctata) which are resident in the large permanent Villus.

Expansion of the boundary 

The boundary of the Wilpattu national park originally enclosed the Puttalam District in the south and Anuradhapura District in the east. On October 10, 2012, the government published several gazettes (section 3 of the forest conservation ordinance, chapter 451) which effectively extended the park's boundary to include regions of the northern province. The expansion of the Wilpattu National Park boundary in 2012 is considered a significant obstacle for internally displaced people, particularly those affected by the Expulsion of Muslims from the Northern Province of Sri Lanka by the LTTE to return to their homeland.

Deforestation 

After the end of the civil war, allegations had been made that parts of the reserve has been occupied to build houses by certain politicians in an attempt to create Muslim colonies in Wilpattu. The multiple civil societies and researchers put forth the notion that these were people who had been forcibly driven away by the LTTE in 1990 in accordance to their ethnic cleansing policy who had returned to their original villages.   Notably, the park was extended to the current size in 1999 after the ethnic cleansing where the old villages were marked as part of the park as claimed by the people in this area. Aerial images taken in 2018 reputedly shows that a considerable portion of the forest has been opened up and a large number of small houses being built in the area.

Gallery 
Photographs of animals taken within the national park.

Birds

Reptiles

Terrestrial animals

References

External links

National parks of Sri Lanka
Ramsar sites in Sri Lanka
Protected areas established in 1938
Protected areas in North Central Province, Sri Lanka
Protected areas in North Western Province, Sri Lanka